Michael or Mike Stephens may refer to:

Michael Stephens (cricketer) (born 1967), New Zealand cricketer
Michael Stephens (soccer) (born 1989), American soccer player for Chicago Fire
Mike Stephens (director), British TV producer and director
Mike Stephens (politician), member of the Missouri House of Representatives

See also
Michael Stevens (disambiguation)
Maurice Michael Stephens (1919–2004), fighter ace with No. 3 Squadron RAF in World War Two